Lasse Lagerblom (born 27 February 1980) is a Finnish former professional footballer who played as a defender for Veikkausliiga side FC Honka.

Personal life
His younger brother Pekka is also a former professional footballer.

References

1980 births
Living people
Finnish footballers
Association football defenders
Veikkausliiga players
FC Honka players